Tim McCarver Stadium was a stadium in Memphis, Tennessee. It was primarily used for baseball and was the home of the Memphis Blues (1968–1976), the Memphis Chicks (1978–1997), and the Memphis Redbirds (1998–1999).

The ballpark had a capacity of 8,800 people and opened in 1963 as an American Legion field, dubbed Fairgrounds #3 due to its location at the former Mid-South Fairgrounds.  Memphis Memorial Stadium, now Liberty Bowl Memorial Stadium, was constructed adjacent to it two years later. It was first used for professional baseball in 1968 and the Memphis Blues had the name changed to Blues Stadium. In October 1977, the new Memphis Chicks franchise changed the name of the ballpark to Tim McCarver Field after Tim McCarver, a Memphis native.

It was unusual in that the infield in later years was AstroTurf so that Kansas City Royals players could practice on the artificial surface in preparation for playing at Kauffman Stadium which until 1995 was AstroTurf.

The facility replaced Russwood Park, the previous baseball park, after its destruction by fire in 1960 which effectively sent Memphis baseball into dormancy for several years. Tim McCarver Stadium was in turn replaced by AutoZone Park in 2000.

The ballpark's address was 800 Home Run Lane, a street which was east beyond right field and a parking lot. The other bordering streets were Raymond Skinner Drive (south, first base); Early Maxwell Boulevard (west, third base); playground and Central Avenue (north, left field).

On July 12, 1993, the ballpark hosted the Double-A All-Star Game in which a team of National League-affiliated All-Stars defeated a team of American League-affiliated All-Stars, 12–7, before 6,335 people in attendance.

The stands were demolished in 2005. The vacant lot is still visible in Google Maps as of 2019, with outlines of the former infield dirt and the outfield fence in evidence.

References

Memphis Redbirds
Defunct minor league baseball venues
Sports venues in Memphis, Tennessee
Baseball venues in Tennessee
Defunct sports venues in Tennessee
1963 establishments in Tennessee
Sports venues completed in 1963
2005 disestablishments in Tennessee
Sports venues demolished in 2005